Elmer Smith may refer to:

 Elmer Smith (activist) (1888–1932), American lawyer and union defender
 Elmer Smith (baseball) (1892–1984), baseball outfielder who played from 1914 through 1925
 Mike Smith (1890s outfielder) (1868–1945), real name Elmer Ellsworth Smith, baseball outfielder who played from 1886 through 1901
 Elmer Roy Smith (1913–1989), politician in Ontario, Canada
 Elmer Boyd Smith (1860–1943), American writer and illustrator
 Elmer Smith (American football) (died 1987), American football and basketball player and coach
 Elmer Smith Power Plant, a power plant in Owensboro, Kentucky